The 11th National Film Awards, then known as State Awards for Films, presented by Ministry of Information and Broadcasting, India to felicitate the best of Indian Cinema released in 1963. Ceremony took place at Vigyan Bhavan, New Delhi on 25 April 1964 and awards were given by then President of India, Dr. Sarvepalli Radhakrishnan.

Starting with 11th National Film Awards, new category of awards for Filmstrips, in the non-feature films section, was introduced. This category includes Prime Minister's gold medal and Certificate of Merit for second and third best educational film. Though gold medal for this category was not given. This award is discontinued over the years.

Awards 

Awards were divided into feature films and non-feature films.

President's gold medal for the All India Best Feature Film is now better known as National Film Award for Best Feature Film, whereas President's gold medal for the Best Documentary Film is analogous to today's National Film Award for Best Non-Feature Film. For children's films, Prime Minister's gold medal is now given as National Film Award for Best Children's Film. At the regional level, President's silver medal for Best Feature Film is now given as National Film Award for Best Feature Film in a particular language. Certificate of Merit in all the categories is discontinued over the years.

Feature films 

Feature films were awarded at All India as well as regional level. For the 11th National Film Awards, a Hindi film Shehar Aur Sapna won the President's gold medal for the All India Best Feature Film. Following were the awards given:

All India Award 

For 11th National Film Awards, none of the films were awarded from Children's Films category as no film was found to be suitable. Only Certificate of Merit for Children's films was given. Following were the awards given in each category:

Regional Award 

The awards were given to the best films made in the regional languages of India. For feature films in Gujarati, President's silver medal for Best Feature Film was not given, instead Certificate of Merit for Best Feature Film was awarded; whereas no award was given in Punjabi language.

Non-Feature films 

Non-feature film awards were given for the documentaries, educational films and film strips made in the country. Following were the awards given:

Documentaries

Educational films

Filmstrip

Awards not given 

Following were the awards not given as no film was found to be suitable for the award:
 Prime Minister's gold medal for the Best Children's Film
 Prime Minister's gold medal for the Best Educational Film
 Prime Minister's gold medal for the Best Filmstrip
 President's silver medal for Best Feature Film in Punjabi

References

Notes

External links 
 National Film Awards Archives
 Official Page for Directorate of Film Festivals, India

National Film Awards (India) ceremonies
1964 film awards
1964 in Indian cinema